Petelo Lautusi is a Samoan weightlifter who has represented Samoa at the Commonwealth Games.

He contested the 2019 Oceania Weightlifting Championships and 2019 Commonwealth Weightlifting Championships, winning silver and bronze in the 102 kg division. At the online 2021 Oceania Weightlifting Championships he won gold in the 109 kg division.

In 2022 he was one of six Samoan weightlifters to qualify for the 2022 Commonwealth Games. On 14 July 2022 he was selected as part of Samoa's team for the 2022 Commonwealth Games in Birmingham.

References

Living people
Samoan male weightlifters
Commonwealth Games competitors for Samoa
Year of birth missing (living people)